Postgraduate Admission Test is a standardized test that is an admission requirement for all graduate schools in mainland China. It is also known as the National Postgraduate Entrance Examination (NPEE) or Chinese abbreviation Kaoyan.

Similar to the National College Entrance Examination (NCEE, NME or NHEEE) which is meant for undergraduate level study, NPEE is an academic examination held annually in People's Republic of China. It is a prerequisite for college undergraduates to entrance the higher education institutions. NPEE is usually taken by students during their last year of university studies.

NPEE takes place in the first Saturday and Sunday before 23 December in lunar calendar (usually in January). So NPEE will be held in the first semester of undergraduates' last year of universities (not like NCEE, which is held on 7th and 8th in June, the end of the second semester of high school students' last year). Also, such rule can cause the NPEE to be held twice a year (although it is an annual examination), for example, the 2014 and 2015 NPEE were both held in year 2014, took place on Jan. 4-6 and Dec. 27-29 respectively.

Subjects of NPEE 
NPEE usually includes a preliminary test and a re-examination. This paper's main discussion is the preliminary test. Usually, there are four subjects for the preliminary test. Two of them are examinations for specialized courses, one for foreign language, and one for politics.

The specific subject of specialized courses depends on the major students applied. It includes Advanced Mathematics, Physical Chemistry, Organic Chemistry, Chemistry Engineering Principle, Translation and Writing and so on.

The re-examination may contain written examination and interview. Usually, it examines the specialized knowledge and skills.

The Advanced Mathematics Examination of NPEE 

The Advanced Mathematics (Adv. Math) examination is one of those specialized courses.

The Advanced Mathematics in NPEE includes many editions. Includes Advanced Mathematics I for Science majors, Advanced Mathematics II for Engineering majors, Advanced Mathematics III for Economic and Finance majors, Agricultural Advanced Mathematics for Agriculture majors and other Mathematics test proposed by the institutions students applied.

Those 4 kinds of Advanced Mathematics examinations (Adv. Math I/II/III and Agricultural Adv. Math) are all proposed by the Ministry of Education. Not like the NCEE, all candidates of China mainland that need to complete the Adv. Math examination will get the same paper, there are no differences between different provinces.

Different major or different institutions may select different Adv. Math papers, even not same as anyone of those 4 kinds before. It means that students apply for some majors of some institutions may get papers written by the institutions they applied for, not proposed by the Ministry of Education.

The Foreign Language Examination of NPEE 

The foreign language in NPEE contains English, Russian, Japanese, French, German and so on. English, Russian and Japanese examinations are unified examinations. It depends on the majors and institutions students chose.

The English examination has 2 editions: English I and English II. They are different, usually, English II is easier than English I.

The candidates applying for academic masters will all take the English I, however, some of the candidates applying for professional masters will take English II.

English I and II tests are all proposed by the Ministry of Education and students in different provinces of China mainland will get same papers.

The Political Examination of the NPEE 

Politics is a required subject for almost all students who take part in the NPEE. Although there are many controversies on it, it is regarded as an effective method to make sure the senior intellectuals of mainland China are loyal to the Central Government and ultimately to the Chinese Communist Party.

The Political Examination is based on 4 courses that students learn during their undergraduate studies. The courses are "Ideology, Morality and Basics of Law", "Introduction to the basic principle of Marxism", "Outline of Modern Chinese History" and "Introduction to Maoism and Theorical System of Socialism with Chinese Characteristics".

The Political Examination of the NPEE in different majors or institutions seems to be the same across the country.
 MD MS ADMISSION 2019-20 INDIA & ABROAD MANAGEMENT/NRI SEAT

References

Postgraduate education
Standardised tests in China